Thomas Sands (August 2, 1907 – November 5, 1984) was an American fencer. He competed in the team épée event at the 1936 Summer Olympics.

A career officer in the United States Army, he attained the rank of major general.

References

External links
 

1907 births
1984 deaths
American male épée fencers
Olympic fencers of the United States
Fencers at the 1936 Summer Olympics
Sportspeople from Dayton, Ohio
United States Army generals